Lin Htut is a Burmese politician who served as Chief Minister of Shan State from 2016 to 2021.

Early life and education 
He was born in Maubin Township, Ayeyarwaddy Division, in 1960. He studied biology and agriculture at Pathein Regional College and started studying dentistry in 1980. He worked as a dentist at Kutkai Hospital in northern Shan State beginning in 1988, then transferred to Lashio General Hospital in 1994. In 2006, he was dismissed and his medical licence suspended after he refused a promotion and transfer order.

Career 
He said he has supported the NLD since seeing Aung San Suu Kyi give a public speech in People's Park in 1988. He became a party member after retiring from his government posts in 2015. In the wake of the 2021 Myanmar coup d'état on 1 February, Linn Htut was detained by the Myanmar Armed Forces.

References 

Living people
National League for Democracy politicians
Government ministers of Myanmar
1960 births
Region or state chief ministers of Myanmar